Rudpey-ye Shomali Rural District is a rural district (dehestan) in the Central District of Sari County, Mazandaran Province, Iran. At the 2006 census, its population was 13,943, in 3,692 families. The rural district has 25 villages.

References 

Rural Districts of Mazandaran Province
Sari County